The Afro-Asian People's Solidarity Organisation (AAPSO) is an international non-governmental organization dedicated to the ideals of national liberation and Third World solidarity. The organization is based in Egypt and has around 26-50 staff.

The AAPSO was founded as the Solidarity Council of the Afro-Asian Countries at a conference held in Cairo  December 1957 to January 1958. The name was changed to its present form at the second conference held in Conakry, Guinea in April 1960. The AAPSO has 90 national committees. The Soviet Afro-Asian Solidarity Committee was a charter member. Observer status was held by the World Federation of Trade Unions, World Federation of Democratic Youth, Women's International Democratic Federation and the World Peace Council.

National committees

See also 

Organization of Solidarity with the People of Asia, Africa and Latin America

References

External links 
 
Afro-Asian Solidarity and the World Mission of the Peoples of Africa and Asia by Anwar Sadat, a speech given at the founding congress

Organizations established in 1957
Third-Worldism